Lieutenant General Ian John Cave,  is a British Army officer who has served as Commander Home Command since June 2021.

Military career
Cave was commissioned into the Queen's Lancashire Regiment on 4 September 1987. He was subsequently transferred to the Royal Welch Fusiliers on 9 February 1988.

Cave served as commanding officer of the 1st Battalion, the Mercian Regiment and in that capacity saw action in the Iraq War in 2008, for which he was awarded a Queen's Commendation for Valuable Service. He went on to be Commander, Initial Training Group in February 2011, Director of Training, Field Army in February 2014 and Deputy Chief of Staff (Plans), Joint Force Command Naples in July 2015. After that he became Chief of Staff, Field Army in April 2018 and Commander Home Command in June 2021.

Cave has also been Colonel of the Mercian Regiment since 2018, and was Colonel Commandant of the King's Division, Infantry from December 2021 until December 2022. He was appointed a Companion of the Order of the Bath (CB) in the 2020 New Year Honours.

References

 

Companions of the Order of the Bath
British Army lieutenant generals
British Army personnel of the Iraq War
British Army personnel of the War in Afghanistan (2001–2021)
Living people
Mercian Regiment officers
Queen's Lancashire Regiment officers
Recipients of the Commendation for Valuable Service
Year of birth missing (living people)